Waimania Teddy (born 13 February 1979) is a former female rugby union player. She was in the Black Ferns squad that won the 2006 Women's Rugby World Cup.

In 2000, Teddy was part of the Auckland Storm team that defeated the Lady Waratahs 35–5 in a Super 12 curtain raiser at Eden Park. She played in the Black Ferns 33-8 win over England at Eden Park in 2005.

Teddy was also named in the Black Ferns side that faced the Wallaroos in the second of two tests in 2009.

References

External links
Black Ferns Profile

1979 births
Living people
New Zealand women's international rugby union players
New Zealand female rugby union players